The Army of the Northwest was a U.S. Army unit formed at the outset of the War of 1812 and charged with control of the state of Ohio, the Indiana Territory, Michigan Territory and Illinois Territory.

Campaigns 
The first commander, William Hull, was in charge while the regiment was at Detroit, before he surrendered it to the British.  James Winchester was appointed to lead the army back up north to retake Detroit, but he turned to defend Fort Defiance instead.  Due to Winchester's unpopularity, President James Madison soon appointed General William Henry Harrison as commander of the army in late 1812.  Harrison led the army in the Siege of Fort Meigs and the Battle of the Thames. 

Under him, in actions that caused the greatest number of deaths in a battle in the War of 1812, Winchester led a contingent in what is called the Battles of Frenchtown, or the Battles of the River Raisin on  January 18 and 22, 1813; in the second conflict, United States (US) forces were taken by surprise and overwhelmed by allied British and Native American warriors. After the Battle on the 22nd About 100 US soldiers Heads were cut off and were stuck on pickett fences for their fellow soldiers to see while being marched off. "The Ghastly wounds of the Dead sickend the Battlefield". The  River Raisin  Massacre of January 23 took place with 65 killed by the Native American warriors. As many  American soldiers, And at least  12 children, 2 women and 12 men after the Americans had surrendered and the Prisoners Of War (POWs) were being marched to Fort Malden in British Ontario it would later be known as the Nations Biggest calamity during the war even the founding fathers knew of this disaster. Out of 1,060 US troops, more than 410 were killed and another 551 with the brigade staff were made POWs, with the US Non-Commissioned Officers (NCOs) suffer killed & missing: 375 /POW's: 471  Total NCO's killed, Missing, & made POW's:846 .Out of 1,060 us Troops only 33 soldiers or less survive. In Winchester's Army he also had 300 on the sick list all at one time from typhus fever. 

Today there is The National Tomb of the Unknown Soldiers of 1812 Society & "The Old 1812 Guard volunteer Infantry Regiment" these are The Guards and Sentinels of the National Tomb of Unknown Soldiers of 1812 at the River Raisin. Known as the Old 1812 Guard volunteer Infantry Regiment, Nicknames  "Volunteers in the North Western Army of the United States" & “The Old Army of the Northwest”  composed of civilian volunteers & volunteers of the Army Reserve, Army National Guard & Army ROTC. as the visitors experience the True early 19th-century military. Their Latin motto is Haec Protegimus (This We Guard) To Preserve, Protect, Remember - (Ad Hanc retinete, protegere recordabor).

The events at the River Raisin remain a significant moment in United States history and the battlefield where so many Americans paid the ultimate sacrifice for the defense of the United States deserves the highest degree of Federal protection and interpretation.   H.R.401 - River Raisin National Battlefield Act 111th Congress (2009–10)

“National Tomb of the unknown Soldiers of 1812” which soon comes to symbolize the sacrifices of all service members in the war of 1812. 

The death toll  total of some 41,700 Americans in proportion to a population of roughly eight million (circa 1813) places the War of 1812 as the third most lethal foreign war in U.S. history.

Commanders
The following men served as commanders of the Army of the Northwest:
 William Hull
 James Winchester (September 5, 1812–September 24, 1812)
 William Henry Harrison (September 24, 1812–June 1, 1814)
 Duncan McArthur (June, 1814–May 17, 1815)

Notes

References 
 
 
 

 Military units and formations of the United States Army by war
American military units and formations of the War of 1812